Carroll Morgan may refer to:
 Carroll Morgan (boxer)
 Carroll Morgan (computer scientist)

See also
 Carol Morgan, Irish ultrarunner